Mao Bingqiang (born 19 July 2001) is a Chinese freestyle skier in the freeski halfpipe event. He competed in the 2018 Winter Olympics and the 2022 Winter Olympics.

References

2001 births
Living people
Freestyle skiers at the 2018 Winter Olympics
Freestyle skiers at the 2022 Winter Olympics
Chinese male freestyle skiers
Olympic freestyle skiers of China